Estelle Cascarino (born 5 February 1997) is a French professional footballer who plays as a defender for Manchester United of the Women's Super League, on loan from Division 1 Féminine club Paris Saint-Germain, and the France national team.

Club career
Cascarino started playing football at the age of thirteen for the youth teams of Olympique Lyon. She made her debut in the Division 1 Féminine in Olympique Lyonnais' 2014–15 season. While at Olympique Lyonnais, she won two Division 1 titles. Cascarino signed her first professional contract in 2015. In June 2016, Cascarino left Olympique Lyonnais as she felt that she would not have been selected due to a lack of first team opportunities. She moved to FCF Juvisy (later renamed as Paris FC) on a two-year contract.

On 9 July 2021, Paris Saint-Germain announced the signing of Cascarino on a three-year deal.

On 21 January 2023, Cascarino joined English Women's Super League club Manchester United on loan until the end of the season. She made her debut for the club on 29 January, entering as a 68th-minute substitute in a 2–1 win away to Championship side Sunderland in the fourth round of the 2022–23 Women's FA Cup.

International career
Cascarino was called up to play for the France women's under-16 national football team in 2012. From there, she moved up the individual French national age grades between 2012 and 2016. In 2016, she played in both the 2016 UEFA Women's Under-19 Championship and the 2016 FIFA U-20 Women's World Cup at the respective age groups. In 2017, Cascarino made her debut for the France women's national football team in a friendly against Ghana.

Personal life
Cascarino is the twin sister of Delphine Cascarino who also plays football professionally as a midfielder. They are not related to Tony Cascarino, although they are often asked if they are. Her father is Italian and her mother is from Guadeloupe.

Career statistics

Club
.

International
.

Scores and results list France's goal tally first, score column indicates score after each Cascarino goal.

Honours
Paris Saint-Germain
 Coupe de France féminine: 2021–22

Notes

References

External links
 
 
 Paris FC player profile
 
 
 

1997 births
Living people
French people of Guadeloupean descent
French sportspeople of Italian descent
Women's association football defenders
French women's footballers
France women's youth international footballers
France women's international footballers
Division 1 Féminine players
Olympique Lyonnais Féminin players
Paris FC (women) players
FC Girondins de Bordeaux (women) players
Paris Saint-Germain Féminine players
Twin sportspeople
French twins
Sportspeople from Lyon Metropolis
Footballers from Auvergne-Rhône-Alpes
Manchester United W.F.C. players
French expatriate women's footballers
French expatriate sportspeople in England
Expatriate women's footballers in England